The William Randolph Hearst Greek Theatre, known locally as simply the Greek Theatre, is an 8,500-seat Greek Theatre owned and operated by the University of California, Berkeley in Berkeley, California, USA.

The Greek Theatre hosts The Berkeley Jazz Festival, pop, rock, and world music concerts, UC Berkeley graduation ceremonies, occasional addresses by noted speakers, and other events. Past speakers include President Theodore Roosevelt, William Randolph Hearst, Bishop Desmond Tutu, and the Dalai Lama.

History
The Hearst Greek Theater was built in 1903 on the site of a rough outdoor bowl already in use as an amphitheater since 1894 known as "Ben Weed's Amphitheater". The project was championed by University of California president Benjamin Ide Wheeler and was the first university building designed by John Galen Howard. Its construction was financed by newspaper magnate William Randolph Hearst, after whom it was named.  The design of the theater is based directly on the ancient Greek theater of Epidaurus.

It officially opened on September 24, 1903, with a student production of The Birds by Aristophanes. However, while still under construction in May 1903, the theatre hosted a graduation ceremony with an address by President Theodore Roosevelt, who was a friend of Wheeler's from New York.

In 1957, a basement backstage area was added, which was designed by Ernest Born. It includes a large plaza flanked by two stage-level constructions.

In 1967 The Grateful Dead played the Greek for the first time, and went on to play 29 total concerts by 1989.

It was listed on the National Register of Historic Places in 1982.

Over the years, the Greek Theatre has seen performances from hundreds of musical and theatrical artists. The Greek has also long been the venue for a number of annual events including departmental graduation ceremonies, the commencement convocation for graduating seniors, and the Bonfire Rally before the Big Game each year with Stanford. Charter Day ceremonies and inaugurations of University of California presidents and Berkeley chancellors have been held at the Greek Theatre with certain exceptions, such as the 1962 Charter Day ceremony at which President John F. Kennedy spoke -- held at California Memorial Stadium for its larger capacity.
 
Another Planet Entertainment became the exclusive concert promoter at the Greek in 2004.

In May 2012, a seismic retrofit and expansion was designed by Palo Alto architecture firm, CAW Architects and constructed by Overaa Construction. Four new reinforced concrete columns were added and concealed in the original structure.

Gallery

See also
List of contemporary amphitheatres

References

1903 establishments in California
Amphitheaters in California
Buildings and structures in Berkeley, California
Music venues in the San Francisco Bay Area
Theatres on the National Register of Historic Places in California
National Register of Historic Places in Berkeley, California
University of California, Berkeley
John Galen Howard buildings
Greek Revival architecture in California
Tourist attractions in Berkeley, California
Event venues established in 1903
Event venues on the National Register of Historic Places in California
Amphitheaters on the National Register of Historic Places